Reggie Nadelson is an American novelist, known for writing mystery novels.

Early life
She was born and raised in Greenwich Village in Manhattan, New York. After graduating from City and Country School and Elisabeth Irwin High School in Greenwich Village, she majored in English at Vassar College, and then earned a graduate degree in journalism at Stanford. Nadelson was raised in a secular Jewish family and describes herself as such today. She has reported on secular Jewish culture in America for the BBC radio show, From Our Own Correspondent.

Career
She migrated to London for The Guardian newspaper, and subsequently The Independent. She also began writing documentaries for the BBC. She has also contributed to the United States magazine Vogue, as well as several other London-based newspapers and magazines.

In 1995, she created Artie Cohen, a Russian-born, New York City cop around whom most of her novels would be based.

Tom Hanks has optioned Nadelson's Dean Reed biography Comrade Rockstar and is planning to produce a movie on Reed's life.

Personal life
She spends her time living in both Manhattan and London.

Bibliography

The Artie Cohen series
1995 Red Mercury Blues (also published as Red Hot Blues)
1997 Hot Poppies
1999 Bloody London
2002 Sex Dolls (also published as Skin Trade)
2004 Disturbed Earth
2005 Red Hook
2006 Fresh Kills
2009 Londongrad
2010 Blood Count

Other novels
Somebody Else (2003)
Manhattan 62 (2014)

Non-fiction
Who is Angela Davis?: The Biography of a Revolutionary (1972) See Angela Davis.
Comrade Rockstar (1991) (also published as Comrade Rockstar: The Life and Mystery of Dean Reed, the All-American Boy Who Brought Rock 'N' Roll to the Soviet Union)
''At Balthazar: The New York Brasserie at the Center of the World (2017) See also Balthazar

References

External links
 Official Website
 Artie Cohen Website
 Reggie Nadelson in conversation with Ian Rankin at the Edinburgh International Book Festival, 2010
2011 Interview in Shotsmag Ezine

20th-century American novelists
21st-century American novelists
American mystery writers
Living people
Jewish American novelists
People from Greenwich Village
Vassar College alumni
Year of birth missing (living people)
American women novelists
Novelists from New York (state)
Little Red School House alumni
Stanford University alumni
20th-century American women writers
21st-century American women writers
21st-century American Jews